Lanzada is a comune (municipality) in the Province of Sondrio in the Italian region Lombardy, located about  northeast of Milan and  north of Sondrio, on the border with Switzerland.

Lanzada borders the following municipalities: Caspoggio, Chiesa in Valmalenco, Chiuro, Montagna in Valtellina, Pontresina (Switzerland), Poschiavo (Switzerland), Samedan (Switzerland), Sils im Engadin/Segl (Switzerland).

Demographic evolution

See also 
 
 Marco e Rosa Hut

References

External links
 www.comune.lanzada.so.it/

Cities and towns in Lombardy